Donna Brown may refer to:

 Donna Brown (basketball) (born 1963), Australian basketball player
 Donna Brown (cricketer) (born 1982), Australian cricketer
 Donna Brown (soprano) (born 1955), Canadian soprano opera singer
 Donna Brown, née Donna Tubbs, fictional character on The Cleveland Show
 Donna Brown (Neighbours), née Freedman, fictional character from the Australian TV series Neighbours